Islamkot Tehsil, is a Tehsil in the Tharparkar District in Sindh, Pakistan. Hundreds of neem trees seen on Islamkot-Mithi, Islamkot-Chachro and Islamkot-Nagarparkar roads were planted during chairmanship of Nihalchand Pabani and under his care. For the same reason this region is also known as the Neem tree region. The Civil Aviation Authority of Pakistan is building the Islamkot International Airport here. After the renovation of Islamkot-Mithi Road, the tourism in the area has increased manifold.

Religions

Hindus constitute a majority, accounting for 90% of the population. Others being Muslims.

Sant Nenuram Ashram

The Hindu saint "Shri Sant Nenuram" was born here and Sant Nenuram Ashram located in this region was established by Nihalchand Pabani with the support of local people. Each day twice free meal is served throughout the year in Sant Nenuram Ashram in form of "Bhandhara" which is available for everyone.

People from different castes, creed, race or religion avail this meal on a daily basis and during annual three-day festival of Sant thousands of devotees attend and celebrate it, including both Hindus and Muslims.

See also 
 Amarkot
Mithi
Diplo
Chachro

References

External links
 Islamkot Airport Plan

Populated places in Sindh
Tharparkar District